Liangzhou District is a district and the seat of the city of Wuwei, Gansu province of the People's Republic of China, bordering Inner Mongolia to the east.

Geography
Liangzhou District is located in east Hexi Corridor, north to the Qilian Mountains. It can be divided geographically in three main areas: Qilian Mountains in the southwest, Hexi Corridor in the middle, and desert in the northeast. Liangzhou District is an agricultural oasis located in the Shiyang River catchment area.

Administrative divisions
Liangzhou District is divided to 9 subdistricts, 37 towns and 2 others.
Subdistricts

Towns

Others
 Jiuduntan Headquarters()
 Dengmaying Lake Ecological Construction Headquarters()

See also
 List of administrative divisions of Gansu
 Wang Wei (Tang dynasty)

References

 Official website (Chinese)

Liangzhou District
Wuwei, Gansu